Crnogorac may refer to:

 native name of a male person of Montenegrin ethnicity
 native name of a male person of Montenegrin citizenship
 Crnogorac, a former newspaper in Montenegro, issued from 1871 to 1873
 Crnogorac, a South Slavic surname
 Gradimir Crnogorac, Bosnian footballer
 Jovana Crnogorac, Serbian cyclist
 Dragan Crnogorac , Bosnian Serb war criminal
 Dragan Crnogorac, Croatian Serb politician

See also
 Crnogorka (disambiguation)
 Montenegro (disambiguation)
 Montenegrin (disambiguation)
 Montenegrins (disambiguation)